Flont is a company that provides jewelry as a service, in partnership with over 40 brands.  It was founded in 2016.  A software developer and jewelry retailer, it enables high-touch sales via E-commerce, delivering jewelry to consumer on demand. Flont provides software and logistics services to global jewelry brands, department stores and jewelry retailers for their own sharing services. Its founder was former president of a joint venture with Cartier and Richemont.

In 2018, Chow Tai Fook, the largest jewelry retailer in Asia with a market cap of HK$106 billion, announced a joint venture with Flont, to open up to 500 locations in China, inside Chow Tai Fook retail stores.

History
The founder of Flont, Cormac Kinney, is a software and fintech entrepreneur, whose innovations have been cited in more than 4,000 patents.  He raised over $500 million for eight startups, five of which have been acquired by public companies. The company's investors include Carmen Busquets, an early stage fashion technology investor, known for investments in Net-A-Porter, Business of Fashion, Moda Operandi, Farfetch, and Lyst. In 2017, Adrian Cheng, executive Chairman of Chow Tai Fook and New World Development, announced an investment in the company. Other investors in Flont include senior executives from Google, Coca-Cola, Revlon, The New York Times, Hudson's Bay, Neiman Marcus, Coach Inc., and Ritz-Carlton.

Flont enables consumers to borrow fine jewelry, from brands including Cartier, Bulgari, and Tiffany & Co., and has exclusive partnerships with artisan designers, such as Mimi So, Hearts on Fire, John Hardy, Pamela Love and Sabine Getty. In 2018, Flont added 30 more designers, with an entry level membership of $59 per month.

References

External links 
Flont 

Online jewelry retailers of the United States